Marie Bergström (born in 1982) is a Swedish sociologist and researcher, working in France for the National Institute for Demographic Studies. From the beginning of the 2010s, she has researched online romantic encounters.

Life 
Bergström moved to France at the age of 20. She studied at the University of Paris-VIII, Panthéon-Sorbonne, and Sciences Po, where she studied sociology with Michel Bozon, She was co-director, with Nathalie Bajos, of a "Survey on sexuality in France" published in 2008 by La Découverte editions. From 2007, she researched,  the subject of romantic encounters by Internet sites. “Neither technology nor digital sociology interested me. ».

In France, she became a pioneer in this field, defending a doctoral thesis at the end of September 2014, entitled “Au bonheur des meetings: sexuality, class and gender relations in the production and use of dating sites in France”2,3. Bergström became a research fellow at the National Institute for Demographic Studies (INED), and published in scientific journals such as the Revue française de sociologie, Population & Societies, Population, Contemporary Societies. She collaborated with  Dominique Pasquier. She appeared in the media, from the beginning of the 2010s, such as France Inter in 2011, or Les Inrockuptibles in 2013, Le Monde in 2018, Le Figaro, and Libération, in 2019. Now considered one of the experts on the subject, she is also, for example, one of the guests of a round table organized by the newspaper Le Monde in October 2018 on the following subject : “Is big data going to kill chance encounters? ». She is also asked to be part of the scientific council of a Parisian exhibition opening at the end of 2019 at the Palais de la Découverte, entitled De l'amour.

In 2019 Bergström published a book, entitled The New Laws of Love. Sexuality, couple and encounters in the digital age, which synthesized, after almost a decade of various communications, her work and analyzes in a presentation for the general public. The work is the subject of comments and reviews in many media.

Works 

 2019 : Les nouvelles lois de l’amour. Sexualité, couple et rencontres au temps du numérique, Paris, Éditions La Découverte, 228 pages.
 2019 : Marie Bergström, Françoise Courtel & Géraldine Vivier, « La vie hors couple, une vie hors norme ? Expériences du célibat dans la France contemporaine », Population, vol. 74, n° 1, p. 103-130.
 2019 : Marie Bergström & Dominique Pasquier, « Genre & Internet. Sous les imaginaires, les usages ordinaires », RESET. Recherches en sciences sociales sur Internet, n° 8. URL : https://journals.openedition.org/reset/1329  
 2018 : « De quoi l’écart d’âge est-il le nombre ? L’apport des big data à l’étude de la différence d’âge au sein des couples », Revue française de sociologie, vol. 59, n° 3, p. 359-422.
 2016 : « (Se) correspondre en ligne. L’homogamie à l’épreuve des sites de rencontres », Sociétés contemporaines, vol. 4, n° 104, p. 13-40.
 2016 : « Les rencontres en ligne : rapidement sexuelles, souvent occasionnelles », in Olivier Martin & Éric Dagiral (dir.), L’ordinaire d’internet. Le web dans nos pratiques et relations sociales, Paris, Armand Colin, p. 83-99.
 2016 : « Sites de rencontres : qui les utilise en France ? Qui y trouve son conjoint ? », Population & Sociétés, n° 530.
 2014 : « Au bonheur des rencontres : sexualité, classe et rapports de genre dans la production et l’usage des sites de rencontres en France », Marie Bergström, 2014, thèse de doctorat.

References 

Living people
1982 births
Swedish women sociologists
Swedish emigrants to France